The 1996 All-Ireland Senior Football Championship Final was the 109th All-Ireland Final and the deciding match of the 1996 All-Ireland Senior Football Championship, an inter-county Gaelic football tournament for the top teams in Ireland. It went to a replay and was eventually won by Meath, with Mayo losing. Neither team was expected to make the final as the competition got underway; Meath were expected to lose to Carlow in their first game of the Leinster Senior Football Championship. However, it would be for the most significant breach of on-field discipline in the sport's history that the 1996 All-Ireland final would be remembered.

The brawl
Tommy Dowd got a goal and Brendan Reilly got the winning point but none of this matters: all is forgotten now apart from the infamous brawl which broke out over by the Cusack Stand in the shadow of Hill 16. Every man on the pitch soon found himself in the middle of the melee, apart from Meath's Brendan Reilly, Mayo goalkeeper John Madden and his full-back Kevin Cahill. Almost 30 players joined in a brawl that will go down in history as one of the worst ever seen at a GAA match.

Referee Pat McEnaney sought to punish those he deemed the worst offenders. He decided he would send off Mayo's Liam McHale and Meath's John McDermott. "When it all settled down my gut instinct was to send off McDermott with McHale. I had my mind made up on that", McEnaney later said.

Then he consulted with umpire Francie McMahon, who had witnessed something dreadful. "Pat," he said. "You're going to have to send off Colm Coyle. He's after dropping about six of them". One of the linesmen, Kevin Walsh, intervened to also highlight Coyle's indiscretions.

McEnaney sent off McHale and Coyle. McHale has never claimed not to have been involved in the brawl that day; indeed, he is on record as saying: "I was right in the middle right from the start". Coyle had arrived later.

The games
Ray Dempsey's 45th-minute goal gave Mayo a lead of six points; however, a Meath comeback, culminating in a last-minute Colm Coyle long-range point, saw the game end in a draw on a scoreline of 1–9 to 0–12.

The final ended in a draw, Meath getting last-minute point when Colm Coyle pumped the ball in that was allowed to bounce and ended up over the bar. As is customary, a replay followed. Meath won by a point, with goals by Trevor Giles (penalty) and Tommy Dowd. Meath's Mark O'Reilly was just a boy that day.

Brendan Reilly scored the winning point.

It was the first of two All-Ireland football titles for Meath that decade, followed by success in 1999. 

This was the second consecutive All-Ireland Senior Football Championship Final replay in which at least at least one player sent off; Gerry McEntee was sent off in the 1988 All-Ireland Senior Football Championship Final replay.

Drawn game

Details

Replay

Details

Post-match
Inaccurate stories spread afterwards that McEnaney had received hate mail at his home, but, McEnaney later said, the only letter he received (from a Meath supporter) praised McEnaney for how he had handled the brawl.

The teams did not meet again the championship until 2009.

McHale and McEnaney had not spoken, as of 2009.

References

External links
 Balls Remembers Mayo's Thrilling But Doomed All-Ireland Bid In 1996
 Pat Spillane's "slow waltzes" analysis of the brawl on The Sunday Game

All-Ireland Senior Football Championship Final
All-Ireland Senior Football Championship Final, 1996
All-Ireland Senior Football Championship Finals
All-Ireland Senior Football Championship Finals
Brawls in team sports
Gaelic football controversies
Mayo county football team matches
Meath county football team matches